The Museum of Museums (MoM) is a contemporary art center in Seattle, Washington, created and managed by curator, artist, and entrepreneur Greg Lundgren.

MoM is contained within a three-story mid-century medical building, designed by NBBJ, on the Swedish Medical Center campus. It previously was used for medical offices and records storage, among other businesses. Lundgren made an agreement with Swedish Health Services in 2019 to renovate the building, unused since , as an art museum.

MoM has 8,000 square feet of space hosting two formal exhibition spaces, two additional on-site museums, rotating installations, murals and sculpture, a theater, weekly art classes, pop-ups, and conceptual gift shop.

References

External links 

 

Museums in Seattle
Contemporary art galleries in the United States